Tipping is a surname. Notable people with the surname include:

Andrew Tipping (born 1942), retired Supreme Court of New Zealand judge
Bartholomew Tipping IV (1648–1718), High Sheriff of Berkshire
Bartholomew Tipping VII (1735–1798), High Sheriff of Berkshire
E. W. "Bill" Tipping (1915–1970), Australian journalist, social commentator and activist
Fred Tipping, Canadian 20th century trade organizer
Henry Avray Tipping (1855–1933), British writer and garden designer
Justin Tipping, American film and television director
Lindsay Tipping (1950–1994), Australian rules footballer
Marjorie Tipping (1917–2009), Australian historian
Norm Tipping (1913–2002), Australian rugby league player and coach
Richard Tipping (born 1949), poet and artist
Sir Thomas Tipping (knight) (1614–1693), English commissioner
Sir Thomas Tipping, 1st Baronet (1653-1718), English Member of Parliament, son of the above
Sir Thomas Tipping, 2nd Baronet (1700–1725) – see Tipping baronets
Tip Tipping (1958–1993), English stuntman and actor
William 'Eternity' Tipping (1599–1649), English religious writer
William Tipping (1816–1897), English railway magnate and Member of Parliament
English-language surnames